This is a list of battles and campaigns between Mughal and Sikhs armies, which started with the martyrdom of the fifth Sikh guru, Guru Arjan Dev, on the orders of Jahangir. Guru Hargobind, the sixth Sikh guru, introduced the militarization to Sikhism. In response to his father's execution, he fought several battles against the Mughal army and defeated them. Later, another Sikh guru, Guru Tegh Bahadur, was also executed on the orders of Aurangzeb after he refused to convert to Islam. Guru Gobind Singh, the last Sikh Guru, started the Khalsa tradition and fought further battles against the Mughals and their allies. 


Battles

See also 
 Sikh raids on Delhi
 List of battles involving the Sikh Empire
 Afghan-Sikh Wars
 Chhota Ghallughara
 Indian Campaign of Ahmad Shah Durrani
 Gurkha-Sikh War
 Sino-Sikh War
 First Anglo-Sikh War
 Second Anglo-Sikh War
 Mughal–Maratha Wars
 Rajput Rebellion
 List of wars involving the Mughal Empire

References

Sources

External links

Battles involving the Mughal Empire
Battles involving the Sikhs
Wars involving the states and peoples of Asia
17th-century conflicts
18th-century conflicts
Wars involving the Mughal Empire